Murğuzallı (also, Murğuzalılı, Murquzalılı, Murguzali, Murguzally, Murguzalyly, and Mursal) is a village and municipality in the Imishli Rayon of Azerbaijan.  It has a population of 611.

References 

Populated places in Imishli District